Mohotti Kankanange Albert (10 September 1895 – 1944) was a cricketer who played first-class cricket for Ceylon from 1926 to 1934.

A right-handed opening batsman with an unorthodox style and limitless patience, Mohotti Albert was one of Ceylon's leading batsmen in the 1920s and early 1930s. In 1925 he set a record for the annual match between the Europeans and the Ceylonese, one of the major domestic matches in Ceylon at the time, scoring 175 for the Ceylonese; he broke his own record in 1929 by scoring 188.

He made his highest first-class score when he made 66 and 42 for Dr J Rockwood's Ceylonese XI against the touring Maharaj Kumar of Vizianagram's XI in 1930–31. He toured India in 1932-33 on Ceylon's first tour, scoring 227 runs in five matches at an average of 22.70.

He worked in the Audit Department of Ceylon Government Railways.

References

External links

1895 births
1944 deaths
Sri Lankan cricketers
All-Ceylon cricketers
Sinhalese Sports Club cricketers